A National Scenic Byway is a road recognized by the United States Department of Transportation for one or more of six "intrinsic qualities": archeological, cultural, historic, natural, recreational, and scenic. The program was established by Congress in 1991 to preserve and protect the nation's scenic but often less-traveled roads and promote tourism and economic development. The National Scenic Byways Program (NSBP) is administered by the Federal Highway Administration (FHWA).

The most scenic byways are designated All-American Roads, which must meet two out of the six intrinsic qualities. The designation means they have features that do not exist elsewhere in the United States and are unique and important enough to be tourist destinations unto themselves. As of January 21, 2021, there are 184 National Scenic Byways located in 48 states (all except Hawaii and Texas).

History
The NSBP was established under the Intermodal Surface Transportation Efficiency Act of 1991, which provided $74.3 million in discretionary grants. On May 18, 1995, FHWA specified the intrinsic qualities that would serve as criteria for designating road as National Scenic Byways or All-American Roads. In September U.S. Transportation Secretary Federico Peña announced the first 14 National Scenic Byways and six All-American Roads. On June 9, 1998, the Transportation Equity Act for the 21st Century (TEA-21) provided $148 million to states so they could develop state roads to take advantage of the program.

On August 10, 2005, President George W. Bush signed the Safe, Accountable, Flexible, Efficient Transportation Equity Act: A Legacy for Users (SAFETEA-LU), which provided $175 million to states and Indian tribes. On October 16, 2009, U.S. Transportation Secretary Ray LaHood designated 37 new roads as National Scenic Byways and five new All-American Roads. The U.S. Department of Transportation approved the designation on January 19, 2021, of 34 new roads as National Scenic Byways, in addition to 15 new All-American Roads.

Requirements
National Scenic Byways go through a nomination procedure. They must already be designated state scenic byways to be nominated (However, roads that meet all criteria for national designation but not state designation may be considered for national designation on a case-by-case basis).

Intrinsic qualities
For designation as a National Scenic Byway a road must have one of six intrinsic qualities. To be designated an All-American Road, a road must have at least two of the six qualities.

Scenic quality is the heightened visual experience derived from the view of natural and manmade elements of the visual environment of the scenic byway corridor. The characteristics of the landscape are strikingly distinct and offer a pleasing and most memorable visual experience.
Natural quality applies to those features in the visual environment that are in a relatively undisturbed state. These features predate the arrival of human populations and may include geological formations, fossils, landform, water bodies, vegetation, and wildlife. There may be evidence of human activity, but the natural features reveal minimal disturbances.
Historic quality encompasses legacies of the past that are distinctly associated with physical elements of the landscape, whether natural or manmade, that are of such historic significance that they educate the viewer and stir an appreciation for the past. The historic elements reflect the actions of people and may include buildings, settlement patterns, and other examples of human activity.
Cultural quality is evidence and expressions of the customs or traditions of a distinct group of people. Cultural features include, but are not limited to, crafts, music, dance, rituals, festivals, speech, food, special events, or vernacular architecture.
Archeological quality involves those characteristics of the scenic byways corridor that are physical evidence of historic or prehistoric human life or activity. The scenic byway corridor's archeological interest, as identified through ruins, artifacts, structural remains, and other physical evidence have scientific significance that educate the viewer and stir an appreciation for the past.
Recreational quality involves outdoor recreational activities directly associated with and dependent upon the natural and cultural elements of the corridor's landscape. The recreational activities provide opportunities for active and passive recreational experiences. They include, but are not limited to, downhill skiing, rafting, boating, fishing, and hiking. Driving the road itself may qualify as a pleasurable recreational experience. The recreational activities may be seasonal, but the quality and importance of the recreational activities as seasonal operations must be well recognized.

Corridor management plans
A corridor management plan must also be developed, with community involvement, and the plan "should provide for the conservation and enhancement of the byway's intrinsic qualities as well as the promotion of tourism and economic development". The plan includes, but is not limited to:

A map identifying the corridor boundaries and the location of intrinsic qualities and different land uses within the corridor.
A strategy for maintaining and enhancing those intrinsic qualities.
A strategy describing how existing development might be enhanced and new development might be accommodated while still preserving the intrinsic qualities of the corridor.
A general review of the road's or highway's safety and accident record to identify any correctable faults in highway design, maintenance, or operations.
A signage plan that demonstrates how the State will insure and make the number and placement of signs more supportive of the visitor experience.
A narrative describing how the National Scenic Byway will be positioned for marketing.

Corridor management plans for All-American Roads must also include:

A narrative on how the All-American Road would be promoted, interpreted, and marketed in order to attract travelers, especially those from other countries.
A plan to encourage the accommodation of increased tourism, if this is projected. Some demonstration that the roadway, lodging and dining facilities, roadside rest areas, and other tourist necessities will be adequate for the number of visitors induced by the byway's designation as an All-American Road.
A plan for addressing multi-lingual information needs.

The final step is when the highway (or highways) is approved for designation by the United States Secretary of Transportation.

List of byways

Former byways

See also

 Scenic byways in the United States
 State wildlife trails

Notes

References

Further reading

External links

 America's Byways, official National Scenic Byways website from the Federal Highway Administration

 
National Scenic Byway